Don't Get Me Wrong is a 1937 British comedy film co-directed by Arthur B. Woods and Reginald Purdell and starring Max Miller and George E. Stone. It was made at Teddington Studios with sets designed by Peter Proud. The film was made by the British subsidiary of Warner Brothers, made on a considerably higher budget than many of the quota quickies the studios usually produced.

Unlike several of Miller's Teddington films which are now lost, this still survives.

Synopsis
Miller plays a fairground performer who meets a professor who claims to have invented a cheap substitute for petrol.  They team up and persuade a millionaire to finance them to develop and market the product, while unsavoury elements are keen to steal the formula and try all means to get their hands on it, involving slapstick chases and double-crosses.  It then turns out that the miracle fluid is diluted coconut oil, and the genius professor is an escaped lunatic.  The millionaire finds himself taking the brunt of the disappointment.

Main cast
 Max Miller as Wellington Lincoln
 George E. Stone as Chuck
 Olive Blakeney as Frankie
 Glen Alyn as Christine
 Clifford Heatherley as Sir George Baffin
 Wallace Evennett as Dr. Rudolph Pepper
 Alexander Field as Gray

References

Bibliography
 Low, Rachael. Filmmaking in 1930s Britain. George Allen & Unwin, 1985.
 Wood, Linda. British Films, 1927-1939. British Film Institute, 1986.

External links 
 
 Don't Get Me Wrong at BFI Film & TV Database
 Miller's Movies at Max Miller information site

1937 films
1937 comedy films
British comedy films
Films directed by Arthur B. Woods
British black-and-white films
1930s English-language films
Films shot at Teddington Studios
Films set in London
1930s British films